KYIZ (1620 AM) is a radio station broadcasting an urban adult contemporary and talk radio format. Licensed to Renton, Washington, United States, the station serves the Seattle metropolitan area. It has been owned by Kris Bennett since its founding, with studios and offices, shared with KRIZ, located on South Jackson Street in the city's Central District east of downtown. KYIZ's transmitter site is located in Renton off Wells Avenue South. It broadcasts with 10,000 watts by day, but to avoid interfering with other stations on AM 1620, it reduces power at night to 1,000 watts. It uses a non-directional antenna at all times.

KYIZ is one of The Z Twins, two radio stations serving the Puget Sound region, most notably the African-American communities of King and Pierce County, Washington.

Programming

KYIZ has served the African-American community throughout its history. On Sundays, Urban Gospel music (courtesy of sister station KRIZ) is heard from 6 a.m.to 6 p.m. Nationally syndicated shows heard on KYIZ include Rickey Smiley Morning Show, Al Sharpton and D.L. Hughley. Sergio Lacour is the Announcer for a new show called Sergio Lacour's Weekend Jamz on Saturday night at 7pm until 12am PST

History

KYIZ began as the "expanded band" twin to station KRIZ. On March 17, 1997 the Federal Communications Commission (FCC) announced that eighty-eight stations had been given permission to move to newly available "Expanded Band" transmitting frequencies, ranging from 1610 to 1700 kHz, with KRIZ in Renton authorized to move from 1420 to 1620 kHz. A construction permit for the expanded band station, also located in Renton, was assigned the call letters KYIZ on February 23, 1998. KYIZ first signed on the air that same year.

The FCC's initial policy was that both the original station and its expanded band counterpart could operate simultaneously for up to five years, after which owners would have to turn in one of the two licenses, depending on whether they preferred the new assignment or elected to remain on the original frequency. However, this deadline has been extended multiple times, and both stations have remained authorized. One restriction is that the FCC has generally required paired original and expanded band stations to remain under common ownership.

References

External links
The Z Twins

Urban adult contemporary radio stations in the United States
YIZ